Prostatic stromal tumour of uncertain malignant potential (PSTUMP) is a rare tumour of the prostate gland stroma that may behave benign or like cancer.

It can be abbreviated STUMP; an abbreviation used for a uterine lesion of uncertain malignant potential.

References

External links 

Prostate